Rachid Bouarrata (born 26 November 1958) is an Algerian association football manager and former player. He has among others coached CS Constantine in the Algerian Ligue Professionnelle 1.

References

1958 births
Living people
Algerian football managers
CS Constantine managers
CA Batna managers
MC El Eulma managers
US Biskra managers
MO Béjaïa managers
AS Khroub managers
21st-century Algerian people